Andrew Campbell (born 1875) was a Negro leagues catcher for several years before the founding of the first Negro National League.

He played with many popular baseball players of the day, including William Binga, Bobby Marshall, Bill Gatewood, Sherman Barton and Joe Green.

References

External links

Illinois Giants players
Leland Giants players
Minneapolis Keystones players
1875 births
Year of death missing
Kansas City Royal Giants players